Katrine Camilleri (born February 24, 1970) is a Maltese, lawyer and Director of the Jesuit Refugee Service (JRS) Malta. She is known for her work for boat refugees and was awarded the Nansen Refugee Award in 2007.

Early life and education

Born in 1970 on the island of Malta, Camilleri studied law and as student she undertook research into access to rights and protection for refugees. After her graduation from the University of Malta in 1994, she began working in a small law firm, where she came into contact with refugees.

Work

In 2002, the number of asylum seekers and economic migrants arriving in Malta by boat increased sharply, a situation faced by several European countries around the Mediterranean. After first working to prevent the deportation of a Libyan asylum seeker who risked persecution if returned home, Camilleri’s interest in refugee protection grew. In 1996, she started to work with the Malta office of Jesuit Refugee Service (JRS), first as a volunteer, then part-time and eventually full-time. JRS became the first organization to offer professional legal services on a regular basis to detainees in Malta. Since 1997, Camilleri has provided legal advice to hundreds of persons kept in administrative detention centres in Malta.

In 2007, she was awarded the Nansen Refugee Award (United Nations Refugee Award) in recognition of her work for the rights of boat people fleeing across the Mediterranean Sea.

Notes and references

External links
 Nansen Refugee Award goes to advocate for boat people in Malta
 Maltese lawyer wins top UN refugee award for aiding Mediterranean boat people
 Dr. Camilleri talks with Marlene Galea about the Nansen Refugee Award and her work (Podcast)

1970 births
Living people
20th-century Maltese lawyers
21st-century Maltese lawyers
Nansen Refugee Award laureates